The 1989 Indian general election in Jammu and Kashmir to the 9th Lok Sabha were held for 6 seats. Indian National Congress won 2 seats, Jammu and Kashmir National Conference won 3 seats and an Independent candidate won 1 seat.

Constituency details

Results

Party-wise results

List of elected MPs

See also 
 Elections in Jammu and Kashmir
 Results of the 2004 Indian general election by state

References 

Indian general elections in Jammu and Kashmir
1980s in Jammu and Kashmir
1989 Indian general election